Oscar Cardenas (born August 11, 1982 in Havana) is a Cuban judoka, who played for the half-middleweight category. He is a two-time national judo champion, and also, a bronze medalist for his respective category at the 2007 Pan American Games in Rio de Janeiro, Brazil.

Cardenas qualified for the men's half-middleweight class (81 kg) at the 2008 Summer Olympics in Beijing, after claiming a bronze medal at the Pan American Qualifying Tournament in Miami, Florida. He defeated Anthony Rodriguez of France, with a waza-ari (half-score point), in the first preliminary match, but lost his next match a few hours later, to Portugal's João Neto, who automatically scored an ippon at one minute and twenty-five seconds.

References

External links

NBC 2008 Olympics profile

Living people
Olympic judoka of Cuba
Judoka at the 2008 Summer Olympics
Sportspeople from Havana
1982 births
Cuban male judoka
Pan American Games bronze medalists for Cuba
Pan American Games medalists in judo
Judoka at the 2007 Pan American Games
Medalists at the 2007 Pan American Games
20th-century Cuban people
21st-century Cuban people